Panchetgarh (also known as Panchet) is a village in Patashpur II CD Block in Egra subdivision in Purba Medinipur district of state of West Bengal in India.

Demographics
As per 2011 Census of India Panchet had a total population of 4,106 of which 2,120 (52%) were males and 1,986 (48%) were females. Population below 6 years was 454. The total number of literates in Panchet was 3,010 (82.42% of the population over 6 years).

References

Villages in Purba Medinipur district